Jenna Welch Bush Hager (born November 25, 1981) is an American news personality, author, and journalist. She is the co-host of Today with Hoda & Jenna, the fourth hour of NBC's morning news program Today. Hager and her fraternal twin sister, Barbara, are the daughters of the 43rd U.S. President George W. Bush and former First Lady Laura Bush. Hager is also a granddaughter of the 41st U.S. President George H. W. Bush and former First Lady Barbara Bush, great-granddaughter of former US Senator Prescott Bush, niece of former Florida Governor Jeb Bush and first cousin of former Land Commissioner of Texas, George P. Bush.

After her father's presidency, Hager became an author, an editor-at-large for Southern Living magazine, and a television personality on NBC, being featured most prominently as a member of The Today Show as a correspondent, contributor and co-host.

Early life and education

Hager was born on 25 November 1981 at Baylor University Medical Center in Dallas, Texas, and named after her maternal grandmother, Jenna Hawkins Welch. While living in Dallas, she and her sister attended Preston Hollow Elementary School and then The Hockaday School. In 1994, after her father was elected Governor of Texas and the family moved to Austin, Texas, Bush was a student at St. Andrew's Episcopal School, and attended Austin High School from 1996 until her graduation in 2000.

With her father becoming President in 2001, she attended the University of Texas at Austin and took summer classes at New York University. She was a legacy member of Kappa Alpha Theta, her mother's sorority. While there, Jenna and her sister Barbara made national headlines when they were both arrested for alcohol-related charges twice within 5 weeks: on April 29, 2001, Jenna was charged with a misdemeanor for possession of alcohol under the age of 21 in Austin. On May 29, 2001, Jenna was charged with another misdemeanor — attempting to use a fake ID (with the name "Barbara Pierce," her paternal grandmother's maiden name) to purchase alcohol. She pleaded no contest to both charges. Jenna Bush graduated from the University of Texas at Austin with a degree in English in 2004.

2004 U.S. presidential election

She and Barbara asked their father not to run for president in 2000: "Oh, I just wish you wouldn't run. It's going to change our life." Her father told them that he and her mother needed to live their lives. In the winter of 2003, she and Barbara opted to become involved in the 2004 campaign. In response to this decision, she made media appearances during the summer of 2004 prior to the election. She and her sister made several joint public appearances, including giving a speech to the Republican Convention on August 31, 2004. She made headlines when she was found sticking her tongue out to media photographers at a campaign stop in St. Louis. Jenna and Barbara took turns traveling to swing states with their father and also gave a seven-page interview and photo shoot in Vogue. Jenna later confirmed that Barbara and Jenna also developed a friendship with John Kerry's daughters, Alexandra and Vanessa, who campaigned on behalf of their father.

Career

Teaching
Before leaving Washington, D.C. in summer 2006, Hager worked at Elsie Whitlow Stokes Community Freedom Public Charter School for a year and a half as a teacher's aide. She took a leave of absence from the charter school position to work at a shelter as part of an internship for UNICEF's Educational Policy Department in Latin America, specifically Panama. After her internship for UNICEF, Hager returned to her position at the charter school in Washington, D.C. She has done work as a part-time reading coordinator at the SEED Public Charter School in Baltimore, Maryland, and has contributed a monthly news story about education for the Today show.

Writing
In 2007, Hager began marketing a book proposal with the assistance of Robert B. Barnett, a Washington attorney. The title of the book is Ana's Story: A Journey of Hope and it chronicles her experiences working with UNICEF sponsored charities in Latin America, including visits to drought-stricken Paraguay in 2006, while working as an intern for United Nations Children's Fund. HarperCollins announced in March 2007, it would publish the book and it was released September 28, 2007, with an initial printing of 500,000 copies. Her share of the profits will go to UNICEF; the remainder will go to the woman whose life is the basis of the book, assisting in the young woman's continuing education. During the book tour, Hager appeared on The Ellen DeGeneres Show; during the interview Hager telephoned her parents. Hager wrote a second book, in conjunction with her mother, designed to encourage children to read. The book, entitled Read All About It!, was published on April 22, 2008, also by HarperCollins.

On November 26, 2012, Hager was named editor-at-large of Southern Living magazine.

NBC News (2009–present)
Since 2009, Jenna Bush has worked at NBC News as a correspondent, Today contributor and anchor. In August 2009, NBC hired Hager as a correspondent and contributor for The Today Show.

As time has progressed, Hager's profile has increased on Today including filling in as the orange room anchor during the 7AM-9AM hours and substituting for Kathie Lee Gifford or Hoda Kotb during the 4th hour.

In 2018, she interviewed Michelle Obama in a discussion about her life in the White House, the challenges of raising her daughters in the spotlight and her book Becoming. They also discussed the political atmosphere and political bipartisanship, with Obama stating that, despite their political differences, Hager's father, George W. Bush, is a "beautiful, funny, kind, sweet man".

In March 2019, Hager started Read with Jenna, a monthly book club on Today Show. In April 2019, Hager began co-anchoring the fourth hour of Today with Hoda Kotb following Kathie Lee Gifford's departure.

In 2019, Hager was able to participate with Willie Geist in a special episode of How Low Will You Go, that aired on the Today Show.

In 2021, Hager reacted emotionally to the storming of the United States Capitol live on air saying: 

In February 2022, Hager signed a first-look deal with Universal Studio Group.

Personal life

Bush met Henry Chase Hager during the 2004 presidential campaign. They became engaged in August 2007. Before proposing, Hager asked President Bush for permission to marry his daughter. Their relationship became public when the two appeared together at a White House dinner for The Prince of Wales and The Duchess of Cornwall (now King Charles III and queen consort, Camilla) in November 2005. Henry Hager attended St. Christopher's School in Richmond, Virginia, and holds an MBA from the Darden Graduate School of Business Administration at the University of Virginia. He worked as a U.S. Department of Commerce aide for Carlos Gutierrez and as a White House aide for Karl Rove. He is the son of former Virginia Republican Party Chairman John H. Hager, who previously served as Lieutenant Governor of Virginia and as the U.S. Department of Education Assistant Secretary under George W. Bush. The wedding took place during a private ceremony on May 10, 2008, at her parents' Prairie Chapel Ranch near Crawford, Texas. Henry and Jenna Hager have three children.

Unlike most of her relatives (but like her twin sister Barbara), Hager is not a member of the Republican Party. While registering to vote in New York, she mistakenly registered with the Independence Party of New York while meaning to declare herself a nonpartisan. In 2010, Jenna Bush Hager and Barbara Bush told People that they preferred not to identify with any political party, stating, "We're both very independent thinkers."

Hager serves on the board of the Greenwich International Film Festival.

Publications

See also
New Yorkers in journalism
Today (U.S. TV program)#Today Fourth Hour

References

External links

Today Show profile of Jenna Bush Hager

The NOVO Project

1981 births
20th-century American women
21st-century American women writers
American children's writers
21st-century American memoirists
American television reporters and correspondents
Schoolteachers from Maryland
Schoolteachers from Texas
American women educators
Austin High School (Austin, Texas) alumni
Bush family
Children of presidents of the United States
Daughters of national leaders
Living people
Livingston family
People from Dallas
People from Midland, Texas
Schuyler family
American twins
University of Texas at Austin alumni
American women children's writers
American women memoirists
Writers from Baltimore
New York University alumni
American expatriates in Panama
Texas Independents
New York (state) Independents
Hockaday School alumni